Kutlu Adalı (1935 in Nicosia – July 6, 1996), was a Turkish Cypriot journalist, poet, socio-political researcher, and peace advocate.

Background
His family emigrated to Antalya, Turkey, when he was three years old. After completing his secondary education, he returned Cyprus in 1954 taking up employment at Cyprus Turkish Communal Chamber.

Before his retirement, he was the head of the Department of Population and Birth Registration in the recently declared Turkish Republic of North Cyprus.

In the years leading to his assassination, Kutlu Adali was a well-respected journalist working for the left-wing Yeni Düzen newspaper in Nicosia, writing daily in his regular column From Blue Cyprus. While his early works, including his books and periodicals, were nationalistic in content, his latter contributions were critical of the then right-wing establishment prevalent in the north of his home island.

Death
On July 6, 1996, he was fatally machine-gunned, outside his home. To this day, the perpetrators of this crime are yet to be brought to justice. Some sources state the Grey Wolves are responsible for his death, however another source states the Turkish Revenge Brigade is responsible.

On May 23, 2021, Turkish criminal leader Sedat Peker mentioned the former Ministry of the Interior Mehmet Ağar's role in the killing on his YouTube channel, claiming that Ağar demanded a hitman from Peker. He said that he sent his brother Atilla Peker to Cyprus upon Ağar's request, but later was told by Korkut Eken that "another team killed Adalı."

Bibliography
 Köy Raporları (Village Reports), 1961, 1962, 1963 (Turkish)
 Dağarcık (Shepherd's Bag), 1963, (travelogue) (Turkish)
 Söyleşi (Interview), 1968, (Turkish)
 Çirkin Politikacı (The Ugly Politician), Pof, 1969 (satire) (Turkish)
 Hayvanistan (Animalistan), 1969 (satire) (Turkish)
 Sancılı Toplum (Society with Birth Pains), 1969 (Turkish)
 Köprü (The Bridge), 1969, (play) (Turkish)
 Şago, 1970, (play) (Turkish)
 Nasrettin Hoca ve Kıbrıs (Naseruddin Hodja and Cyprus), 1971 (Turkish)

See also
 List of journalists killed in Europe
 List of unsolved murders

References

External links 
An article on the court case following his assassination
 Kutlu Adali (1935-1996)

1935 births
1990s murders in Cyprus
1996 crimes in Cyprus
1996 deaths
1996 murders in Asia
1996 murders in Europe
Assassinated Turkish Cypriot journalists
Deaths by firearm in Cyprus
Journalists killed in Cyprus
Male murder victims
People from Nicosia
People murdered in Cyprus
Turkish Cypriot writers
Unsolved murders in Cyprus